As of 2008, the sixty thousand ethnic Koreans in Greater Los Angeles constituted the largest Korean community in the United States. Their number made up 15 percent of the country's Korean American population.

History
A first wave of Korean immigrants settled at the foot of Bunker Hill and worked as truck farmers, domestic workers, waiters, and domestic help. The Korean United Presbyterian Church was established on West Jefferson Boulevard in 1905. A Korean community developed around this church.

The Ahn Chang Ho residence, which served as a community center and a guidance, lodging, and community support center for new Korean immigrants, housed grocery stores and the offices of the Korean National Association Los Angeles Branch and the Young Korean Academy. In the 1930s the Korean population shifted to an area between Normandie and Vermont Streets in the Jefferson Boulevard area. This Korean area, which became known as the "Old Koreatown," was in proximity to the University of Southern California. By then the first generation of Korean immigrants had children, who lived around the Old Koreatown.

In the 1950s, Los Angeles received a second wave of Korean immigrants resulting from the Korean War and the children of the first generation of immigrants gave birth to the next generation. After the passage of the Hart-Cellar Act in 1965, Korean immigration increased. After the Watts Riots in 1965, many Koreans began moving to suburban communities. In 1970, the Koreans in Los Angeles and Orange Counties made up 63% of the total number of Koreans in the United States. Around this period, the Korean community area moved to Olympic Boulevard, where the modern Koreatown is located.

The Korean community was severely affected by the 1992 Los Angeles riots. One Korean American civilian, Edward Song Lee, died in the rioting. Over $400 million worth of damages occurred, including the destruction of over 2,000 businesses owned by ethnic Koreans. Most of the members of the Korean community refer to them in Korean as the 4-2-9 riot (Sa-i-gu p'oktong). This naming follows the integer naming schemes of political events in Korean history. After the event, many Koreans moved to suburbs in Orange County and the two Inland Empire counties: Riverside and San Bernardino. Since then, investment occurring in Koreatown caused the community to rebuild.

In 2014 a delegation of minor Japanese right-wing politicians requested the removal of a memorial statue of the Korean comfort women in World War II from an area in Glendale, California, sparking controversy. A federal judge dismissed the lawsuit for the statue's removal and was met with support from the Los Angeles City Council, Korea-Glendale Sister City Association, and the Korean American Forum of California as part of a "large-scale effort to raise international awareness of the comfort women's plight." The Japanese American Citizens League and other Japanese-American organizations supported the statue and deplored the Japanese delegation's claim that it had led to racially motivated bullying of Japanese-Americans as propaganda.

Geography
As of 2008, about 350,000 ethnic Koreans live in Los Angeles County. As of 2008 the largest Korean ethnic enclave in Los Angeles is Koreatown and the majority of the Koreans have been concentrated around that area.

By 2008 many ethnic Korean communities had appeared in the northwestern San Fernando Valley, including Chatsworth, Granada Hills, Northridge, and Porter Ranch. That year, the San Fernando Valley Korean Business Directory had a list of almost 1,500 Korean-owned businesses in the San Fernando Valley. Amanda Covarrubias of the Los Angeles Times stated that area Korean community leaders estimated that 50,000 to 60,000 Koreans lived in the San Fernando Valley in 2008.

In addition, by 2008 Korean communities had appeared in Cerritos and Hacienda Heights in Los Angeles County, and Buena Park and Fullerton in Orange County.

Also, a long standing community, known as Koreatown or Little Seoul has been in Garden Grove since the 1970s. This formed the center of the Korean Community of Orange County which later spead out to Buena Park, Fullerton, Cypress, and Irvine.

Demographics
As of 2008, 257,975 Korean Americans lived in Los Angeles, Orange County, Ventura, San Bernardino, and Riverside counties, making up 25% of all of the Korean Americans. As of that year, over 46,000 Koreans lived in Koreatown, making up 20.1% of the residents there. Koreatown, in addition to Koreans, houses other ethnic groups.

Economics
By 1988, in Los Angeles, many Korean stores had opened in African-American neighborhoods, and by then several boycotts by African-Americans of Korean businesses had occurred. By that time many Korean garment manufacturers acted as middlemen by employing Hispanic workers and selling product to White-owned manufacturers of clothing.

In 2014 the federal government ran a raid against business operations that it accused of being money laundering. By 2015 some Korean business owners stated that they may take their operations out of Los Angeles due to a reduction in Latin American customers, an increasing minimum wage, and stricter governmental enforcement of labor laws, all occurring after the 2014 raid.

Culture

The Korean Bell of Friendship is located in San Pedro.

Education

Day schools
The Wilshire Private School (formerly Hankook School, Wilshire Elementary School, and Wilshire School), a private day school, is located in Koreatown. The Korean Institute of Southern California (KISC, 남가주한국학원/南加州韓國學院) operates this school.

Schools which served the children of the first wave of Korean immigrants included Los Angeles High School, Manual Arts High School, and the James A. Foshay Learning Center.

Weekend schools
The KISC and the Korean School Association of America (KSAA, 미주한국학교연합회/美洲韓國學校聯合會) operate weekend Korean language schools, with a combined total of 16,059 students. As of 2003 the KISC operated 12 schools, employing 147 teachers and enrolling 5,048 students. In 1992 there were 152 schools in Greater Los Angeles registered with the KSAA. In 2003 the KSAA had 244 schools, employing 1,820 teachers and enrolling 13,659 students. The number of KSAA-registered schools increased to 254 in 2005.

As of 1988 one of the KISC campuses was in Van Nuys.

Notable people
 Philip Ahn - Actor
 Steven Choi - California State Assemblyman from Orange County
 Joshua Hong - Singer and member of group Seventeen
 Young Kim - Politician resident in Orange County, local congresswoman
 Grace Lee - Film director
 Hee Sook Lee - businesswoman, founder of BCD Tofu House chain
 Lena Park - Singer
 Jessica Jung - Singer and former member of Girls' Generation
 Krystal Jung - Singer F(x) (band)
Michelle Steel, local congresswoman
 Dumbfoundead - Rapper
 Song Oh-kyun - Korean Independence Activist
Tiffany Young - Actress and member of Girls' Generation
 Cathy Park Hong - poet, writer, author of Minor Feelings: An Asian American Reckoning
 Roy Choi - Chef, personality, founder of Kogi
 Joon Park - Singer G.O.D

References
 Abelmann, Nancy and John Lie. Blue Dreams: Korean Americans and the Los Angeles Riots. Harvard University Press, June 30, 2009. , 9780674020030.
 Kim, Jongyun. Adjustment Problems Among Korean Elderly Immigrants in New York and Los Angeles and Effects of Resources on Psychological Distress and Status in the Family (dissertation). ProQuest, 2008. , 9780549566052. UMI Number 3307607.
 Kim, Katherine Yungmee. Los Angeles's Koreatown. Arcadia Publishing, 2011. , 9780738575520.
 Light, Ivan Hubert and Edna Bonacich. Immigrant Entrepreneurs: Koreans in Los Angeles, 1965–1982. University of California Press, 1988. , 9780520076563.

Notes

Further reading
 Gives, Helen Lewis. The Korean community in Los Angeles County. R and E Research Associates, January 1, 1974. Available on Google Books in Snippet form.
 Pyong Gap Min. Korean immigrants in Los Angeles (Volume 2, Issue 2 of ISSR working papers in the social sciences). Institute for Social Science Research, University of California, Los Angeles, 1990. Available on Google Books in Snippet form.

External links
 Korean Resource Center (민족학교)
 Korean Education Center in Los Angeles (로스앤젤레스한국교육원)
 Korean School Association of America
 Korean School Association of America 
 Korean Institute of Southern California
Korean Americans in Los Angeles, interview series, Center for Oral History Research, UCLA Library Special Collections, University of California, Los Angeles.

Koreans
 
History of Los Angeles
Korean-American history
Asian-American culture in Los Angeles